Eurhamphaeidae is a family of ctenophores.

Taxonomy 
The family Eurhamphaeidae contains the following species:

 Genus Deiopea
Deiopea kaloktenota Chun, 1879

 Genus Eurhamphaea
Eurhamphaea vexilligera Gegenbaur, 1856

 Genus Kiyohimea
Kiyohimea aurita Komai and Tokioka, 1940
 Kiyohimea usagi Matsumoto and Robison, 1992

References

Lobata